Patricio Valladares (born 17 July 1982, in Chillán, Chile) is a Chilean film director, screenwriter and comic book writer, best known for his work in horror films, who mixes elements of both arthouse and grindhouse, with an emphasis on modern extreme violence, action and some gore. He is also involved in comics and short movies, and frequently injects black humor or homages to grindhouse movies, along with artistic cinematography, somewhat intellectual dialogue and the occasional surrealism. His serial killers tend to make repeat appearances in his movies.

Directing career
Known for his work in genre cinema Valladares has directed numerous features throughout the years. In 2011, he directed the En las Afueras de la Ciudad (also known as Hidden in the Woods), based a true story. Based a true story, the film made its world appearance at Fantasia Film Festival before touring the globe with appearances at FrightFest Film Festival and among others. Epic Pictures Group is currently handling sales and distribution.  This film caught the attention actor Michael Biehn who would later produce the English language remake through his production company. WT Films is handling worldwide sales, with the pic set for a release in 2016 in numerous territories. The English-language remake of the film

In 2014, Valladares directed Toro Loco: Bloodthirsty a.k.a. Toro Loco: Sangriento, starring by Francisco Melo, Mauricio Pesutic, Simón Pesutic and Constanza Piccoli, dark comedy flick shot entirely in Spanish. The world premiere was held at Morbido Film Fest at Mexico. Event Film is the sales agent. In 2015 he shot three features in English, all of which are currently in postproduction. These are: Downhill (shot in Chile), an experimental horror/thriller. WT Films serves as worldwide sales agent. Has been pick up bye WTFilms as Sales Agent and Co producer. The Ghosts of Garip, part horror, part found footage shot in location in Istanbul, Turkey. Moonrise Pictures is the sales agent.
 
Lastly, he directed Nightworld in Bulgaria with Nightmare On Elm Street star, Robert Englund. These three features were produced by Loris Curci and written by Barry Keating.

Filmography

Director / writer
 2020: Embryo
 2016: Nightworld 
 2016: The Ghosts of Garip 
 2016: Downhill
 2015: Toro Loco: Bloodthirsty
 2014: Hidden in the Woods 
 2012: Hidden in the Woods 
 2011: Toro loco 
 2009: Dirty Love
 2007: Curriculum

Festival awards
Winner: Best Overall, Sickest Flick and Best Director. (TLA Cult Awards) 2014
Winner: Best Extreme Movie, Feratum Film Festival (Mexico) (2012)
Winner: Best Movie, Buenos Aires Rojo Sangre Film Festival ( Argentina) (2012)
Winner: Best Movie, Asti Film Festival (Italy) (2012)
Winner: Best Director, Weekend of Horrors (USA) (2013)
Winner: Best Director, Buenos Aires Rojo Sangre Film Festival ( Argentina) (2015)
Winner: Downhill- Working Progress, Blood Window Ventana Sur ( Argentina) (2015)

Awards and recognitions 
 2011 Fondart Award for the audiovisual project Hidden in the Woods
 2011 GORE BIO BIO Award for the audiovisual project Hidden in the Woods
 2016 CORFO Award for the audiovisual project Suspense
 2017 CORFO Award for the audiovisual project Embryo
 2017 Regional Culture Awards

Film festivals
2009 Sitges Film Festival (Dirty Love)
2012 Fantasia Festival (World Premiere)
2012 London FrightFest Film Festival (Europe Premiere)
2012 Celluloid Scream Film Festival
2012 Serbian Fantastic Film Festiva
2012 Tohorror Film Fest
2012 Asti Film Festival
2012 Festival de Cine de la Habana
2012 Feratum Film Festival
2012 Buenos Aires Rojo Sangre
2013 San Diego Latino Film Festival
2013 HorrorHound Weekend
2013 Weekend of Fear Festival
2013 Blood Window, Ventana Sur.
2014 Film Festival flix (Artsploitation series)
2014 Beyond the Window, Blood Window at Ventana Sur
2015 Morbido Film Festival
2015 Buenos Aires Rojo Sangre
2015 Blood Window at Ventana Sur
2016 Sitges Film Festival (Downhill & Hidden in the Woods, Midnight X-Treme)
2016 Neuchâtel International Fantastic Film Festival
2016 London FrightFest Film Festival 
2016 Morbido Film Fest
2016 Molins Horror Film Festival
2016 Sanfic
2016 Mar del Plata Film Festival
2016 H.P. Lovecraft Film Festival
2017 Moscow International Film Festival
2017 London FrightFest Film Festival 
2017 Morbido Film Fest
2020 London FrightFest Film Festival Halloween
2020 Molins Horror Film Festival
2021 Sanfic
2021 Portland Horror Film Festival

See also
Cinema of Chile

References

External links

 
 

Chilean film directors
Chilean film producers
Chilean male film actors
Horror film directors
Chilean screenwriters
Male screenwriters
Living people
1982 births
People from Concepción, Chile
People from Santiago
Chilean male television actors